A Pure Formality is a 1994 Italian-French drama thriller film co-written and directed by Giuseppe Tornatore. It stars Gérard Depardieu as a reclusive writer and Roman Polanski as a police detective.

Synopsis
Onoff (Depardieu) is a famous writer who is now a recluse. The Inspector (Polanski) is suspicious when Onoff is brought into the police station one night, disoriented and suffering from amnesia. As the head of an isolated, rural police station the Inspector tries to establish events through careful interrogation and deduction. Through his painstaking inquiries, he eventually clears up a mysterious killing and brings the writer to a new and unexpected realisation.

Cast
 Gérard Depardieu - Onoff
 Roman Polanski - Inspector
 Sergio Rubini - Andre, the Young Policeman
 Nicola Di Pinto - Captain
 Tano Cimarosa - Servant
 Paolo Lombardi - Marshall
 Maria Rosa Spagnolo - Paula
 Massimo Vanni

Reception
A Pure Formality was nominated for a Golden Palm at the 1994 Cannes Film Festival. It also received a David di Donatello for Best Production Design (Andrea Crisanti).

References

External links
 
 

Films directed by Giuseppe Tornatore
Italian thriller drama films
1990s Italian-language films
1994 films
1994 crime thriller films
Films scored by Ennio Morricone
Films about amnesia
1990s Italian films